Combined may refer to:
 Alpine combined (skiing), the combination of slalom and downhill skiing as a single event
 Super combined (skiing)
 Nordic combined (skiing), the combination of cross country skiing and ski jumping as a single event
 The Combined (Group), a criminal organization

See also
 
 Combo (disambiguation)
 Combine (disambiguation)
 Combination (disambiguation)